Highway 86S may refer to:

See also
 List of highways numbered 86
 Norinco Type 86S, an assault rifle